Zhang Yu (born 14 July 2001) is a Chinese footballer currently playing as a defender for Hebei China Fortune.

Club career
Zhang Yu was promoted to the senior team of Hebei China Fortune in the 2019 league season and was handed his debut in a league game by the Head coach Xie Feng on 27 November 2019 against Guangzhou Evergrande in a 3-1 defeat where he came on as a substitute for Wang Qiuming.

Career statistics

.

References

External links

2001 births
Living people
Chinese footballers
China youth international footballers
Association football defenders
Chinese Super League players
Hebei F.C. players